Dmytro Pronevych (born 19 November 1984) is a Ukrainian football striker.

References

External links

1984 births
Living people
People from Dubno
Ukrainian footballers
Ukraine student international footballers
Association football forwards
FC Dynamo-3 Kyiv players
NK Veres Rivne players
FC Zorya Luhansk players
FC Hirnyk Rovenky players
FC Obolon-2 Kyiv players
Partick Thistle F.C. players
Queen of the South F.C. players
Dong Thap FC players
FC Dnipro Cherkasy players
FC Knyazha Shchaslyve players
FC Lviv players
FC Arsenal-Kyivshchyna Bila Tserkva players
FC Obolon-Brovar Kyiv players
Ukrainian expatriate footballers
Ukrainian expatriate sportspeople in Italy
Ukrainian expatriate sportspeople in Scotland
Ukrainian expatriate sportspeople in Vietnam
Ukrainian expatriate sportspeople in Finland
Expatriate footballers in Italy
Expatriate footballers in Scotland
Expatriate footballers in Vietnam
Expatriate footballers in Finland
Sportspeople from Rivne Oblast